Sergey Fyodorovich Leontiev (born 9 February 1944 in Leontovka, Podilsk Raion, Odessa Oblast, Ukrainian SSR, Soviet Union) was the Vice President of Transnistria from December 2001 until December 2006.

He studied at the faculty of mathematics and physics of the T. G. Shevchenko University in Tiraspol, Transnistria. He was head of the administrative district of Grigoriopol. He was a deputy of the Supreme Council of Transnistria from 1990 to 2000.
In 2000 he became head of the presidential administration of Transnistria. He was not a candidate in the 2006 election, and hence was replaced by Aleksandr Ivanovich Korolyov.

References

1944 births
Living people
People from Odesa Oblast
Vice presidents of Transnistria
Members of the Supreme Council (Transnistria)